Hetair-  or latinicized Hetaer- is a Greek linguistic root bearing the meaning of companion (cf. Latin Socii and societas). It is used in the following terms:

Ancient Greece
Hetairoi (sing. Hetairos), the name of the Macedonian aristocracy and later Companion cavalry
Hetaira (plural Hetairai),  female sophisticated companions, courtesans
Hetairideia, a festival of Magnesians and Macedonians
Hetairiai  or Ancient Greek clubs, associations of ancient Greeks who were united by a common interest or goal
Hetairia or Andreia, the Cretan terms for Doric Syssitia (common meals)
Hetaireios, an epithet of Zeus

Modern Greece
Filiki Eteria, a secret 19th century organization whose purpose was to overthrow Ottoman rule over Greece and to establish an independent Greek state
The Greek term for company, found in many business names such as Jumbo Anonymi Etairia

Entomology
 Hetaeria, or hairy jewel orchids, a genus in the family Orchidaceae
 Hetaerina: a genus  of damselfly 
 Hetaira (katydid): a genus of bush crickets

Other uses
Hetaireia, a Byzantine imperial guard
 Hetaerism, a theoretical early state of human society that practiced a polyamorous and communistic lifestyle; see Matriarchal religion

Greek words and phrases